PyeongtaekJije Station (formerly known as Jije station) is a subway station located in Pyeongtaek, South Korea. It serves the SRT and Seoul Subway Line 1. A large E-Mart store is very close to the station. On 24 November 2020, the name was changed to PyeongtaekJije.

Station layout

Korail Line 1 platforms

SRT platforms

References

Seoul Metropolitan Subway stations
Metro stations in Pyeongtaek
Railway stations opened in 2006